Exeter Book Riddle 9 (according to the numbering of the Anglo-Saxon Poetic Records) is one of the Old English riddles found in the later tenth-century Exeter Book, in this case on folio 103r–v. The solution is believed to be 'cuckoo'. The riddle can be understood in its manuscript context as part of a sequence of bird-riddles.

Text 

As translated by Harriet Soper, Riddle 9 runs:

Editions and translations 

 Megan Cavell, translation and commentary for Riddle 9, The Riddle Ages: Early Medieval Riddles, Translations and Commentaries, ed. by Megan Cavell, with Matthias Ammon, Neville Mogford and Victoria Symons (Birmingham: University of Birmingham, 2020 [first publ. 2013])
 Foys, Martin et al. (eds.) Old English Poetry in Facsimile Project (Madison, WI: Center for the History of Print and Digital Culture, 2019-). Online edition annotated and linked to digital facsimile, with a modern translation.

Recordings 

 Michael D. C. Drout, 'Riddle 9', performed from the Anglo-Saxon Poetic Records edition (19 October 2007).

References 

Riddles
Old English poetry
Poems about birds